Tokyo Tribes, known in Japanese as , is a Japanese seinen manga series written and illustrated by Santa Inoue. A previous series titled  was published into a single-volume in 1993. Tokyo Tribes was originally serialized from 1997 to 2005 in the urban fashion magazine boon. It is a continuation of the plot in Tokyo Tribe, although many of the characters from that story do not appear in this series. A live-action film adaptation directed by Sion Sono was released in Japan on August 30, 2014.

Characters 
Nagisa -- the protagonist and a member of the Shivuya (an alteration of "Shibuya") Saru gang.
Megane (Specs) -- Nagisa's friend and a member of Shivuya Saru.
Totoro -- Nagisa's friend and a member of Shivuya Saru.
Otogiri -- Shivuya Saru member who lives in Shivuya Mansion. The Saru are often seen at his apartment.
Fujio -- Nagisa's girlfriend.
Iwao -- leader of Saru's rival gang, the Shinjuku (written in katakana differently than the actual place) Hands.
Yama-Chan -- Shivuya Saru member who is attacked by the Hands in Shinjuku.

Plot 
Five years after the Shibuya riots, the Tribes of Tokyo have been enjoying a period of relative peace, until Kim and two other members of the Musashino Saru intrude on the territory of the Wu-Ronz in Bukuro. Mera, the leader of Wu-Ronz kills the three Saru, under the assumption that they were members of the Shibuya Saru.

Two days later, after searching for who killed his friends, Musashino Saru member Kai runs into Mera. Old friends in their high school days, the two get into a confrontation that ends up leaving Tera, the leader of Musashino Saru, dead and setting the stage for violence between the Tribes.

—a DJ and main character of the series.
 The leader of the Buppa clan and the main antagonist of the series, Buppa is shown as a big, morbidly obese, bisexual Yakuza crime lord with a lecherous, sadistic personality.

Media

Manga

Anime 
Opening Theme: Top of Tokyo, by Illmatic Buddha MC's
Ending Theme: TT2 Owari no Uta, by Scha Dara Parr

The show was originally planned as a movie which would have been distributed by MTV.

Film 

A live action film adaptation directed by Sion Sono was released in Japan on August 30, 2014.

Legacy
The series has gained notoriety for a scene in which a man is anally raped to death, which has come to be known as "Goosh Goosh" and is used as a shock video.

References

External links 
 
 
 Tokyo Tribes anime at Media Arts Database 

 
1997 manga
2006 anime television series debuts
Crime in anime and manga
Internet memes introduced in the 2010s
Madman Entertainment manga
Manga adapted into films
Seinen manga
Shodensha franchises
Shodensha manga
Tokyopop titles